The women's 1500 metres at the 2022 World Athletics Championships was held at the Hayward Field in Eugene from 15 to 18 July 2022.

Summary

Championship 1500 races typically are not fast, instead most athletes bide their time and save their energy to kick for the medals at the end.  Gudaf Tsegay didn't get the memo.  From the gun, she took off at a serious fast pace.  Only her Ethiopian teammate Hirut Meshesha, Olympic Champion Faith Kipyegon and Olympic silver medalist Laura Muir chose to go with her.  150 metres into the race, a gap was already formed.  The first 400 metres was covered in under 59 seconds, which would be a good opening lap of an 800 metres.  The gap was 15 metres to the others.  On the second lap, Meshesha was struggling to stay on the back of the breakaway group, then as compensation, sped up to pull even with Tsegay causing Kipyegon to tighten up to the group.  But that burst was Meshesha's last gasp as she began to fall off the back.  The medals looked settled.  The second lap pace dropped off to a little more reasonable 64.3.  After 1 kilometer, Tsegay looked back at Kipyegon in frustration with her just hanging on behind.  Coming in to the bell, Kipyegon obliged and pulled even.  The two ran virtually shoulder to shoulder, Kipyegon around the outside of the turn, then on the backstretch, Kipyegon pulled ahead.  From there Kipyegon continued to widen her lead to almost 10 metres by the finish.  Tsegay opened up about 5 metres on Muir to take silver.

Records
Before the competition records were as follows:

Qualification standard
The standard to qualify automatically for entry was 4:04.20.

Schedule
The event schedule, in local time (UTC−7), was as follows:

Results

Heats 

The first 6 athletes in each heat (Q) and the next 6 fastest (q) qualify for the heats.

Semi-finals 
The first 5 athletes in each heat (Q) and the next 2 fastest (q) qualify for the final.

Final 
The final was started on 18 July at 19:50.

References

1500
1500 metres at the World Athletics Championships